Lepida, witty in Latin, may refer to:
 Aemilia Lepida, a Roman woman 
 Aemilia Lepida (fiancee of Claudius) (5 BC-?), a noble Roman woman and matron
 Domitia Lepida the Elder (c. 19 BC-59), the oldest child of Lucius Domitius Ahenobarbus and Antonia Major 
 Domitia Lepida the Younger (c. 10 BC-54), the younger daughter of Lucius Domitius Ahenobarbus and Antonia Major
 Junia Lepida (c. 18-65), a Roman noble woman
 a mountaintop of Mount Erymanthos in Greece
 Lepida Gorge of Parnon in Arcadia, Greece

See also
 Lepidus (disambiguation)